The Friendly Sons of St. Patrick, officially The Society of The Friendly Sons of St. Patrick for the Relief of Emigrants from Ireland, is an American charitable and social organization for Irish-Americans founded in 1771.

Organizational history

Founding and purposes 
The Society was founded in Philadelphia, Pennsylvania on March 17 (St. Patrick's Day), 1771.

Among the founders were General Stephen Moylan, aide to George Washington and cavalry commander in the Revolutionary War, and Thomas Fitzsimons, representative of Pennsylvania in the Continental Congress and signatory of the U.S. Constitution, both of whom were born in Ireland. George Washington became an honorary member in 1782.

Originally founded as a charitable organization with the intent of aiding migrants from Ireland, the organization has since developed a focus on encouraging "greater interest in ties of friendship between America and Ireland," in addition to sponsoring scholarships, cultural events, charity activities, and educational endowments.

New York City and other branches 
On March 17, 1784, a group of New York City's Irish officers who had served in the Continental Army formed the Society of the Friendly Sons of St. Patrick in the City of New York. Its founder and first president was Daniel McCormick, a merchant who was one of the first directors of the Bank of New York.

Branches of the Society have also been founded in cities such as Cincinnati, Detroit, Providence, San Diego, and Spokane. The Cincinnati branch has an active glee club which has performed hundreds of benefit and goodwill performances for over 25 years.

Each branch operates independently. Originally all-male, the Philadelphia branch first admitted women in 2016. The New York branch plans to admit women to its annual pre-St. Patrick's Day fundraising dinner for the first time in 2018, but has not said whether women will be admitted as members.

Founding members 

General Stephen Moylan was one of the Society's organizers and its first president. Other founding members included:
 Thomas Barclay
 John Nixon
 William West
 Thomas Fitzsimons
 George Meade

Other early members included:
 John Leamy
 Commodore John Barry
 General Anthony Wayne
 General John Cadwalader
 General William Irvine
 General Richard Butler
 General William Thompson
 Tench Francis Jr.

Honorary members included:
 George Washington
 Robert Morris
 Richard Bache
 John Dickinson

List of presidents 

* Died in office
** Resigned
*** Resigned and removed from Society notifications

References

External links

 Pennsylvania
 Official website (Philadelphia)
 Harrisburg Friendly Sons of St. Patrick
 Lackawanna County Friendly Sons of St. Patrick
 New York
 Society of the Friendly Sons of St. Patrick in the City of New York
 Long Island Friendly Sons of St. Patrick
 Westchester County Friendly Sons of St. Patrick
 New Jersey
 Jersey Shore Friendly Sons of St. Patrick
 Morris County Friendly Sons of St. Patrick
 Union County Friendly Sons of St. Patrick

 Others
 Alabama Friendly Sons of St. Patrick (Alabama)
 San Diego Friendly Sons of St. Patrick (California)
 Central Iowa Friendly Sons of St. Patrick (Iowa)
 Baltimore Friendly Sons of St. Patrick (Maryland)
 Cincinnati Friendly Sons of St. Patrick (Ohio)
 New Bedford Friendly Sons of St. Patrick (Massachusetts)
 Detroit Friendly Sons of St. Patrick (Michigan)
 Roseville Friendly Sons of St. Patrick (Michigan)
 Providence Friendly Sons of St. Patrick (Rhode Island)
 Pawtucket Friendly Sons of St. Patrick (Rhode Island)
 Spokane Friendly Sons of St. Patrick (Washington)

Clubs and societies in the United States
Irish-American history
Irish-American culture in Philadelphia
Irish-American culture in Pennsylvania